Oedemasylus is a genus of beetle in family Curculionidae. It contains the following species:
 Oedemasylus laysanensis (extinct)

References 

Entiminae
Taxonomy articles created by Polbot